McKinney North High School (commonly known as North, McKinney North, or MNHS) is a public secondary school located on 2550 Wilmeth Road in McKinney, Texas, US. The school is part of the McKinney Independent School District. Mckinney North currently holds the most zoned space in McKinney. McKinney North High School opened to its first freshman class in the year 2000. North was also recently updated to a "recognized" status via the TEA.

Mission statement
The mission of McKinney North High School is to equip all students with the essential tools for success in and beyond the classroom by instilling accountability for personal growth, developing meaningful relationships and implementing innovative, challenging, engaging instruction with a shared responsibility for unleashing excellence.

Academics
McKinney North operates on a 7:30 a.m. to 2:37 p.m. schedule, which includes seven-class periods and a twenty-six-minute lunch period. Students may not leave campus during this time due to MISD's closed campus policy.

Athletics
Despite the school's short history, it has managed to achieve success in a myriad of events. The MNHS Lady Bulldogs won the 2006 4A U.I.L. Texas State Championship in soccer, The baseball and softball teams also have a storied history in the playoffs making it to the State semifinals and area finals, respectively. Also, the cross-country program has qualified for the U.I.L. state championship twice and has won 5 district championships in all. Also, for Cross Country, Samantha Means won the 4A title, but also set the Texas time record. The McKinney North Tennis Team has won 8 district titles and 11 total playoff appearances.  The tennis team has been ranked in the state's top 25 every year since the school has opened.  Jordan Hart won back to back state tennis titles in 2012 & 2013. The lady bulldogs also placed 2nd in the 4A Basketball state championship in 2014. They also have a very successful football program making it to the playoffs for 2 straight years. In 2011, the Bulldogs finished the regular season at 6-4 and went to the playoffs for the first time in 5 years.

The McKinney North Bulldogs compete in the following sports:

 Baseball
 Basketball
 Cross Country
 Football
 Golf
 Powerlifting
 Soccer
 Softball
 Swimming & Diving
 Tennis
 Track & Field
 Volleyball
 Wrestling

Clubs
Agriculture FFA
ASL Honor Society
AVID - Advancement Via Individual Determination
BELS - Business Education Law Sciences
Blue Blazers
Broadcast
Candy Bouquet
Cheerleading
Chess Club
Criminal Justice
Debate Team
DECA
Fellowship Of Christian Athletes
German Club
Green Cord
Guard Dawgs
HOSA
International Thespian Society #6460
Japanese Culture Club
Journalism
Key Club
Latin Club
National Art Honor Society
National Honor Society
Netflix Club
Parent Teacher Student Organization
Peer Assistance and Leadership (PALs)
Polaris Newspaper
Robotics
Spanish Club
Student Council
Table Tennis
TAFE
The Interact Club
University Interscholastic League (UIL)
Writing Club
Yearbook

Fine Arts
Art
Band
Choir
Dance/Drill
Orchestra
Theatre

Controversies
In 2006, a group of cheerleaders from McKinney North High School, one of whom was the daughter of the then-school principal, Linda Theret, became notorious for truancy, rudeness in class, violations of the school's dress code and other acts of misconduct. The scandal broke into national news when the school's cheerleading coach, Michaela Ward, resigned in protest in October of that year and began talking to news and media outlets.

In December 2006, the District Board hired a Dallas attorney, Harry Jones, to investigate the issue. Then-Principal Theret was placed on paid administrative leave and later retired, and the superintendent has said she would not return to the school or any other campus.

In October 2009, Theret joined the Laredo Independent School District in Laredo in Webb County in south Texas as the new executive director of curriculum and instruction, under the supervision of A. Marcus Nelson, the district superintendent. Nelson defended his choice of Theret, who was a colleague of his during the late 1990s. "First of all, she's been a 5-A high school principal" and a successful teacher for diverse, urban groups. Theret said that her entire career had been "focused on raising student achievement ... I'm very interested in the science of teaching, but the art as well." Nelson said that Theret was his first choice among forty-six applicants for the position.

The McKinney cheerleader scandal was portrayed in 2008 in the TV movie Fab Five: The Texas Cheerleader Scandal, which Lifetime Television transmitted in August 2008; the name of the school was changed, as were the names of the students and the teachers involved.

Notable alumni
Mike Bolsinger, Major League Baseball player
Justin Madubuike, football player for Baltimore Ravens
Ronald Jones II, football player for Tampa Bay Buccaneers

References

External links
 

Educational institutions established in 2000
2000 establishments in Texas
McKinney Independent School District high schools